Farsinaj-e Jadid (also Romanized as Fārsīnaj-e Jadīd; also known as Farsīkh, Fārsīnaj, and Fārsīneh) is a village in Parsinah Rural District, in the Central District of Sonqor County, Kermanshah Province, Iran. At the 2006 census, its population was 2,287, in 559 families.

References 

Populated places in Sonqor County